Ma Yanping (born 5 February 1977) is a Chinese cyclist. She competed at the 2000 Summer Olympics and the 2004 Summer Olympics.

References

1977 births
Living people
Chinese female cyclists
Olympic cyclists of China
Cyclists at the 2000 Summer Olympics
Cyclists at the 2004 Summer Olympics
Place of birth missing (living people)
Cyclists at the 1998 Asian Games
Cyclists at the 2002 Asian Games
Asian Games medalists in cycling
Medalists at the 1998 Asian Games
Medalists at the 2002 Asian Games
Asian Games gold medalists for China
20th-century Chinese women
21st-century Chinese women